The German Party may refer to:

 The German-Hanoverian Party - A regionalist party based in the old Kingdom of Hanover
 The German Party (1947) - A regionalist and conservative political party and governing coalition party
 The German Party (1961) - A minor defunct German conservative party
 The German Party (1993) - A small right wing party active in Germany
 The German Party (Romania)
 The German Party (Slovakia)
 The German Party (Yugoslavia)
 The German Party of the Zips